The 2019 Cheshire West and Chester Council election took place on 2 May 2019 to elect members of Cheshire West and Chester Council in England. This was on the same day as other local elections. Five fewer seats were contested because of boundary changes. No party gained overall control. The Labour Party gained a seat but lost control of the council; the Conservatives lost 8 seats, while the Independents gained 4, the Liberal Democrats gained 2, and the Green Party gained one.

Background
At the 2015 election, Cheshire West and Chester (CWaC) was the only council to be won by Labour from the Conservatives. The Liberal Democrats had lost their last seat on the council, while both UKIP and the Green Party had increased their vote share but failed to win seats. With only a narrow Labour majority, the Conservatives were hopeful of regaining the council. However, the aftermath of the Brexit referendum had significantly reshaped British party politics and BBC journalist Phil McCann noted that CWaC was the most evenly divided borough in the North West in terms of Leave/Remain, making the effect of Brexit on the election difficult to predict.

Between the 2015 and 2019 elections, a boundary review was carried out. The number of councillors was reduced from 75 to 70, with some wards merged and others split. In total, there were 219 candidates – 70 Conservative, 66 Labour, 49 Liberal Democrat, 18 Green, 11 independents (including Eveleigh Moore-Dutton, elected in 2015 as a Conservative), 4 UKIP and 1 For Britain Movement. 24 existing councillors stood down.

Results

Overall election result

|-

The election saw Labour narrowly lose its majority, winning 35 seats of the 70 available – a result local election analyst Andrew Teale attributed chiefly to the boundary changes – but remain the largest party. The Conservatives fell back considerably, with just 28 seats, but still won the largest share of the vote. The Liberal Democrats returned to the council, winning 2 seats in Winsford Swanlow (formerly Labour) and Farndon (formerly Conservative), and the Greens won their first ever seat on CWaC, taking Helsby from the Conservatives.
Independents also surged – incumbents Martin Barker in Parkgate and Eveleigh Moore-Dutton in Tarporley held their seats, and two further independents won a seat from the Conservatives in the multi-member wards of Weaver and Cuddington, and Hartford and Greenbank. In April 2020, Hartford and Greenbank Independent Cllr Phil Herbert joined the Conservative Group.

Results by ward

Blacon

Central and Grange

Chester City and The Garden Quarter

Christleton and Huntington

Davenham, Moulton and Kingsmead

Farndon

Frodsham

Gowy Rural

Great Boughton

Handbridge Park

Hartford and Greenbank

Helsby

Lache

Ledsham and Manor

Little Neston

Malpas

Marbury

Neston

Netherpool

Newton and Hoole

Northwich Leftwich

Northwich Winnington and Castle

Northwich Witton

Parkgate

Rudheath

Sandstone

Saughall and Mollington

Shakerley

Strawberry

Sutton Villages

Tarporley

Tarvin and Kelsall

Tattenhall

Upton

Weaver and Cuddington

Westminster

Whitby Groves

Whitby Park

Willaston and Thornton

Winsford Dene

Winsford Gravel

Winsford Over and Verdin

Winsford Swanlow

Winsford Wharton

Wolverham

Notes

References

2019
2019 English local elections
May 2019 events in the United Kingdom
2010s in Cheshire